The 1977 Colgate Tennis Patrons Classic, also known as the Hong Kong Open, was a men's tennis tournament played on outdoor hard courts in Hong Kong. It was the fifth edition of the event and was held from 7 November through 13 November 1977. The tournament was part of the Two Star tier of the 1977 Grand Prix tennis circuit. Unseeded Ken Rosewall won his second consecutive singles title at the event.

Finals

Singles
 Ken Rosewall defeated  Tom Gorman 6–3, 5–7, 6–4, 6–4
 It was Rosewall's 1st singles title of the year and the 42nd of his career in the Open Era.

Doubles
 Kim Warwick /  Syd Ball defeated  Marty Riessen /  Roscoe Tanner 7–6, 6–3

References

External links
 ITF tournament edition details

Viceroy Classic
1977 in Hong Kong
Tennis in Hong Kong